University of Houston Charter School (UCHS) was a state charter primary school located in the Melcher Gymnasium 100 at 3855 Holman Street in Houston, Texas, United States. The school was operated by the University of Houston. The university operated the school in affiliation with its Human Development Laboratory School. The Texas State Board of Education chartered the school.

The school first opened on January 29, 1997. It was one of the nineteen schools to be granted the first school charters under Texas law. In 2007 it had almost 130 students. Historically the maximum enrollment was 138.

The education program emphasized problem solving and was known as "constructivist". The UH board annually spent $268,000 to operate the school.

In December 2020 the principal alerted parents that the board would consider whether to close the school, catching some parents off guard. That month the UH board voted to close the school due to problems with the COVID-19 pandemic in Texas and general financial problems. By December 2020 enrollment was down to 89, and the school had a shortage of employees. The charter was scheduled to expire in July 2021, when the institution would ordinarily have applied for renewal. The school was closed on July 31, 2021.

See also

 List of schools in Houston
 List of state-chartered charter schools in Greater Houston

References

External links
 University of Houston Charter School

Public elementary schools in Texas
Public education in Houston
Charter School
University-affiliated schools in the United States
Charter schools in Texas
Educational institutions established in 1997
1997 establishments in Texas
Educational institutions disestablished in 2021
2021 disestablishments in Texas